Choudhary Kedarnath Thakur (1 June 1901 – 3 March 1952) was the Zamindar of Singhwara Estate. The estate situated in the Darbhanga district of Mithila in Bihar. He belonged to the Zamindar Family of Mithila (region). He held his title over his family estates in the Singhwara when such titles were abolished following the Independence of India.

Family history
Choudhary Kedarnath Thakur was a scion of the Singhwara estate family. He was the son of Choudhary Munindra Narayan Thakur, the Zamindar of Singhwara Estate. He was born on 1 June 1901 in a Maithil Brahmin family.
He was also elected as chairman of the reception committee of the A.I.M.Y.C by Kameshwar Singh the Maharaja of Darbhanga.

Books
He was the regular reader of magazines or books published in Hindi, Maithili, Bangla, and Sanskrit. Hori Pachisi is a collection of 25 Holi-related songs in Maithili written by Thakur. During his life Thakur also produced a number of books including a novel  Saundaryooashnaka Puraskar and the play Dahej, and he translated a number of Bengali and Persian stories into Maithili, including Gramkatha (from Bengali to Maithili) and Nongar Sneha (from Persian to Maithili) between 1930 and 1940. The Maithili scholar Dr. Harendra Mohan carried a detailed study upon Saundaryooashnaka Puraskar( Novel ), and it was published in the year 1932.

Death
In 1952, Thakur fell ill and died at his home place.

Gallery

References

1901 births
1952 deaths
History of Bihar
Mithila
Zamindari estates